The Hielanman's Umbrella is a landmark in the centre of Glasgow, Scotland. It is the local Glaswegian nickname for the glass walled railway bridge which carries the platforms of Glasgow Central station across Argyle Street. It is built in Victorian style.

History 
Due to the forced displacement of people during the second phase of the Highland Clearances in the 19th century, 30,000 highlanders who spoke Scottish Gaelic, but not English, came to Glasgow to find work. When arriving in the city they were housed in many different areas of Glasgow. 

The highlanders predominantly found work within domestic service in areas like Park Circus or in one of the many industries, where they would work, for example, for the river ferries. Over many years highlanders continued to arrive and began to keep in touch by meeting under the bridge, mostly at weekends. With the city's inclement weather and the meeting of the highlanders it came to be known as the Hielanman's Umbrella. At the meetings they would share news and gossip from the homelands and of events in the city. 

The Umbrella tradition reached its height in the '20s and '30s, however, due to the Second World War and the resulting blackout, the tradition of meeting under the bridge died.  

The first long-distance television pictures transmitted in the UK were sent to Glasgow Central Station in 1927.

Recent Development 
Glasgow Central Station and the Hielanman's Umbrella has been renovated several times.

In 1998, the bridge was substantially refurbished by Railtrack (which later became Network Rail in 2002) in line with the rest of the station - its distinctive Venetian style windows were reglazed, and the gold "Central Station" lettering was applied.  Efforts were also made to improve the environment underneath the bridge to encourage retailers back into the shop units - high powered lighting and extractor fans were installed.  The street level entrances to Central Station under the bridge were also upgraded.

In 2001, a new entrance to the burgeoning Arches nightclub and restaurant complex was added under the bridge which has led to the level of pedestrian footfall increasing markedly.

In 2015 The Hielanman's Umbrella, as part of the Glasgow Central Station, won the Scottish Design Award. 

In November 2019 a ten-year-regeneration plan for the Glasgow city centre was announced, including a plan of turning the Hielanman's Umbrella into a light and attractive station lobby.

Appearances in Literature 
The Hielanman's Umbrella is mentioned in Jackie Kay's novel Trumpet from 1998:

It also appears in Simon Jenkins' book Britain's 100 Best Railway Stations from 2017.

References

External links

Highland Clearances
Buildings and structures in Glasgow
Bridges in Glasgow
1879 establishments in Scotland
Bridges completed in 1879